Svein Weltz (born 28 July 1936) is a Norwegian footballer. He played in two matches for the Norway national football team from 1959 to 1960.

References

External links
 

1936 births
Living people
Norwegian footballers
Norway international footballers
Place of birth missing (living people)
Association footballers not categorized by position